David Cumberlidge (born 16 July 1996) is an English swimmer who won a silver medal in the Men's 4 × 100 metre freestyle relay at the 2018 Commonwealth Games in Gold Coast, Australia, and a gold medal in the 50m freestyle event at the 2019 Summer Universiade.

Career
Cumberlidge gave up swimming at the age of 14, but returned to swimming aged 17. In 2015, Cumberlidge joined the University of Edinburgh swimming team. Cumberlidge won the 50m freestyle event at the 2016 and 2017 British Summer Championships. His 2017 time of 22.03 was a personal best, the fourth best time ever by a Briton, and quicker than the qualifying time for the 2018 Commonwealth Games. Cumberlidge won the 50m freestyle event at the 2018 British Swimming Championships in Edinburgh.

Cumberlidge, Ben Proud, Jarvis Parkinson, and James Guy won a silver medal in the Men's 4 × 100 metre freestyle relay at the 2018 Commonwealth Games in Gold Coast, Australia. Cumberlidge swam the opening split in 49.28 seconds. Cumberlidge also came fourth in the individual 50m freestyle event. Cumberlidge won a gold in the 50m freestyle event at the 2019 Summer Universiade. He was the fourth British swimmer in history to go under 22 seconds. He was part of the Swim England Performance Squad for the 2021–22 season.

Personal life
As of 2021, Cumberlidge was a student of geothermal energy at the University of Edinburgh.

References

External links
 
 

1996 births
Living people
English swimmers
Commonwealth Games silver medallists for England
Commonwealth Games medallists in swimming
Swimmers at the 2018 Commonwealth Games
Universiade medalists in swimming
Universiade gold medalists for Great Britain
Medalists at the 2019 Summer Universiade
Sportspeople from Newcastle upon Tyne
Alumni of the University of Edinburgh
Medallists at the 2018 Commonwealth Games